Factomania is a factual television series that was first broadcast on BBC Knowledge and BBC HD on 3 April 2014. The hosts for the ten-part series are Dominic Byrne, Fran Scott and Greg Foot.

Production
Factomania is a 360 Production for BBC Worldwide. BBC America included the series in its first co-production deal with BBC Worldwide. Lucy Pilkington is the executive producer for BBC Knowledge.

References

BBC television documentaries
English-language television shows
BBC America original programming
2014 British television series debuts